This general annotated bibliography page provides an overview of notable and not so notable works in the English language regarding the sport of fly fishing, listed by year of first publication. Although not all the listed books are devoted exclusively to fly fishing, all these titles contain significant fly fishing content. The focus of the present page is on classic general texts on fly fishing and its history, together with notable public or university library collections dedicated to fly fishing.
 For readability, the bibliography is contained in three separate lists. For books primarily dedicated to fly tying, fly tackle, regional guides, memoirs, stories and fly fishing fiction see: Bibliography of fly fishing (fly tying, stories, fiction).
 For species related fly fishing literature see: Bibliography of fly fishing (species related).

Annotations

Annotations may reflect descriptive comments from the book's dust jacket, third party reviews or personal, descriptive and qualitative comments by individuals who have read the book.  Some older works have links to online versions in the Internet Archive or Google Books.

Notable fly-fishing library collections
 The Western Washington University Fly Fishing Collection, Bellingham, Washington

 Kienbusch Angling Collection, Princeton University Library, Princeton, New Jersey

 The Kenneth H. Rockey Angling Collection, Princeton University Library
 The Daniel B. Fearing Collection, Houghton Library, Harvard University

 The LaFontaine Angling Collection, University of Wyoming's American Heritage Center, Rare Book Collection, Laramie, Wyoming. Library website
 Frederick and Clara Toppan Angling Book Collection, University of Wyoming's American Heritage Center, Rare Book Collection. Library website
 American Museum of Fly Fishing, Manchester, Vermont, The museum's library ranks as one of the largest public collections of fly-fishing books in America. Museum website
 The Reed Draper Collection of Angling Books, Clarke Historical Library, Central Michigan University, Mount Pleasant, Michigan
 Harry Hawthorn Foundation Collection, University of British Columbia, Vancouver, British Columbia

 Milne Angling Collection, University of New Hampshire Library, Durham, New Hampshire

 George Harvey Fly-Fishing Literature Collection, Penn State University Life Sciences Library, State College, Pennsylvania
 Trout & Salmonid Collection at Montana State University, Montana State University, Bozeman, Montana

 Contains the following notable collections:
 Strung, Norman (Literary manuscripts and correspondence, 1966–1982)
 Pellicane, Alfred T. (Papers, 1962–2000)
 Mitchell, Harry B. (Papers, 1953–1965)
 Agassiz, Louis (Letters, 1854–1858)
 Salmon Poisoning Research Collection (Papers, 1923–1999)
 Nick Lyons Ephemera Collection (Corporate records and personal papers, 1932–2005)
 Behnke, Robert J. (Papers, 1957–2000)
 Angling Oral History Collection

15th-century texts

17th-century texts
  The Secrets of Angling contains the first known illustration of an artificial fly.  Denny's book was reprinted extensively in the 19th century.
  Izaak Walton did not profess to be an expert with the fly; the fly fishing in his first edition was contributed by Thomas Barker, a retired cook and humorist, who produced a treatise of his own in 1659. In the last edition a second part was added by his friend Charles Cotton, who took up Venator where Walton had left him and completed his instruction in fly fishing and the making of flies.
   Extensively cited in Herd's The Fly, Venables work provides great insight into the fly tackle and techniques being used in the 17th century

18th-century texts
  Online Version (7th Edition – 1790), the Brookes text, which went through seven editions in the late 18th century, are extremely important in closing the gap of knowledge about fly fishing from the time of Walton to the early 19th century.  Brookes is also the first to make written references to fly fishing in saltwater.
  this work first appeared in 1787 and ran through 13 editions.

19th-century texts
  Angling in All Its Branches was one of the first works to address Fly fishing for Salmon and tying salmon flies. Taylor was the first fly fishing author to mention the use of a fly tying vice.
  Bainbridge was one of the first authors to use color plates and The Fly Fisher's Guide contains numerous plates showing fly patterns, materials and tying techniques.
 
  Dr. Andrew Herd credits Rennie with being the first author to describe the complicated methods of producing fly hooks in the 19th century.
 
  this 231 page, well illustrated treatment of British stream insects of importance to the trout and grayling angler laid the foundation for the detailed works on artificial fly imitation theory that followed for the next 100 years, see also The Fly-fisher's Entomology and Alfred Ronalds.
 
 
 
 
  The Art of Angling was in print for over 100 years in 16 editions from 1747 to 1854

 
  Online Version (1st Edition); Online Version (5th Edition, 1867); Online Version (8th Edition, 1883); Online Version (1907 Edition)
  Frank Forrester, the pseudonym for English born Henry William Herbet was one of the most popular sporting writers before the Civil War. He popularized Hunting and Fishing with commercially successful sporting books such as this one,.
 
 

  Otter was a pseudonym for H. J. Alfred of London.
 
 
 
 
 
 
 
 
 
  this was Halford's first book, and it launched the opening salvo in the decades long battle pitting fly fishers favoring the floating fly against those endorsing the sunk fly, an argument which today seems as appropriate as the house cook slipping on boxing gloves in preparation to picking out fly droppings from the black pepper. Nine color plates of hand colored flies. One color chart. Text illustrations. Six 19th century American fly patterns laid in. 136 pp. including index, see also Floating Flies and How to Dress Them.
 
 
 
 
   a readable but comprehensive discussion of wet fly, dry fly, sea-trout and salmon fly fishing written in an easy, story-telling style.  See also Fly Fishing (Grey book)  A angling classic

Fly-fishing history, bibliographies and literature reviews

19th century

20th century
  Dr. Andrew Herd credits Hill with the first attempt to codify the history of fly fishing, albeit Hill's work shows a distinctly British bias and disregard for other European influences.  See also A History of Fly Fishing for Trout
 
 
 
  contains a Chronological Appendix Indicating Landmarks in the Evolution of Angling Literature and Some Prefatory Matters Pertaining to the History of The Harry Hawthorn Foundation for the Inculcation and Propagation of the Principles and Ethics of Fly-Fishing. Contains illustrations.
 
  listed as one of the modern "classics" of angling in the University of New Hampshire Library Milne Angling Collection
  Gingrich, the well known founding editor of Esquire magazine surveys the major pieces of classic and modern fly fishing literature up through the 1950s.  It is an excellent read to get a better understanding of the evolution of the various styles of fly fishing—wet, nymphs, dry, etc. as originally written about by the likes of Halford, Skues, Gordon and Jennings along with many others.

 
  an alphabetical, by author, list of over 2000 titles of American published fishing books with values for collectable copies estimated by the author.
  sponsored by the American Museum of Fly Fishing, Manchester, CT, when Paul Schullery was the managing director, Fly Fishing – A History is probably the most contemporary and complete treatise on the evolution of fly fishing as it is known today.
  a notable account by Ernest Schwiebert and one of the seminal books on American Fly Fishing clubs.
  while giving due respect to the elders of Fly-Fishing history, Schullery celebrates some lesser-known fisherman and some seldom-appreciated waters, such as the limestone streams of Pennsylvania.  He muses on the pursuit of the ever-more perfectly "natural" fly and contrasts that quest with the storied success of the Royal Coachman, perhaps the gaudiest fly ever invented.

21st century

Biographies
  in 1927, celebrated Canadian author Frank Parker Day wrote his autobiographical reflections on fishing, family, and, more broadly, humanity's place in the natural world. The Autobiography of a Fisherman, a Canadian fly-fishing classic, is a wonderful recollection of one man's life, with characters struggling in a depressed economy, contending with the social pressures of local village life, and responding in one way or the other to the pull of the big city. Day details his early introduction to fishing, which becomes a lifelong passion, at once a 'gentle art' and a 'disease'.
 
 
 
 
  the first definitive biography of the father of dry fly fishing, Frederic M. Halford.
 
  – autobiography of Lefty Kreh

General fly fishing
  1st US edition of this 1867 book.
 
  New Naturalist #23
  A modern guide to fly fishing in reservoirs and lakes.
  more on the fishing life than how to, but much information about light tackle fly fishing from the founding editor of Esquire. Contains useful bibliographic references to other fly fishing literature.
  a general treatise on the basics of freshwater, warmwater and saltwater fly fishing and tackle.

  a compendium of articles by top fly fishing experts on the various aspects of freshwater, warmwater and saltwater fly fishing and tackle.  Sponsored by the Cortland Line Company.
  a beautiful compilation of vignettes on fly fishing accompanied by excellent photography of fly fishing experiences.
 
  this is a twenty-five volume set published by Kreh and other authors covers almost every aspect of the sport of fly fishing. Contains the following titles:

Notes

Fly fishing literature
Fly fishing
Recreational fishing-related lists